Bovingdon Green is a hamlet in the civil parish of Great Marlow, just to the west of the town of Marlow in Buckinghamshire, England.

References

External links

Hamlets in Buckinghamshire